Helga María Vilhjálmsdóttir (born April 25, 1995 in Akureyri, Iceland) is an alpine skier from Iceland. She competed for Iceland at the 2014 Winter Olympics in the alpine skiing events. She had the best results of the athletes who represented the country at the Winter Olympics as well.

On August 24, 2017, Helga broke her leg while training on the Folgefonna glacier in Norway. Due to a difficult infection in the fracture she has not been able to train since the accident. The Icelandic Health Insurance agency came to the conclusion that Helga was not entitled to injury compensation as she was training with a foreign athletic club abroad, despite she was there on behalf of the Icelandic ski national team who paid for her training as there were no suitable training sites in Iceland due to the time of year.

World Championship results

Olympic results

Other results

European Cup results

Results per discipline

References

1995 births
Living people
Helga Maria Vilhjalmsdottir
Alpine skiers at the 2014 Winter Olympics
Helga Maria Vilhjalmsdottir
Helga Maria Vilhjalmsdottir
Alpine skiers at the 2012 Winter Youth Olympics
21st-century Icelandic women